Wotan is a character in Richard Wagner's Der Ring des Nibelungen inspired by the Germanic god Odin.

Wotan may also refer to:
 "Wotan", an essay by Carl Jung included in Notes of the Seminar Given in 1928–1930
 Wotan (horse), an Australian racehorse in the 1930s
 , a German tanker in service 1913-14 and 1915–19
 Wotan, an A7V (a tank) that was scrapped by the Allies in 1919, also a replica A7V that was built in the 1980s
 Wotan I, also known as X-Gerät, a German World War II radio navigation project
 Wotan II, also known as Y-Gerät, another German radio navigation project
 WOTAN, a villain in the Doctor Who franchise
 Wotan (comics), a villain who fought Doctor Fate and the Golden Age Green Lantern

See also
 Wotanism (disambiguation)
 Woden (disambiguation)
 Odin (disambiguation)